The Ceraunian Mountains ("Thunderbolt mountains"; , Keravnia ori), also commonly Akroceraunian Mountains, are a coastal mountain range in southwestern Albania, within the county of Vlorë. The range rises on the northeastern bank of the Ionian Sea. Geologically, the Karaburun Peninsula belongs to the mountain range, forming the eastern Akroceraunian Mountains.

The Llogara Pass divides the mountains into a western and the Akroceraunian Mountains within the Karaburun Peninsula.

Name
The name Ceraunia is derived from Ancient Greek Κεραύνια ὄρη, meaning "thunder-split peaks" and illustrates the bad weather and the danger found there by ancient seafarers and travellers.

History
The Ceraunian mountain range is located in the northernmost part of the wider historical and geographical region of Epirus. According to Greek mythology, the Abantes from Euboea who had previously joined the Ancient Greek army in the Trojan War settled in the Ceraunian Mountains. They were later expelled by the forces of the Ancient Greek city-state of Apollonia. 

The Ceraunian Mountains have been described by ancient writers such as Ptolemy, Strabo and Pausanias. Consequently, the mountains are still known under their classical name. Julius Caesar first set foot on Llogara Pass and rested his legion at Palasë on the Ionian coast during his pursuit of Pompey.

See also 
 Geography of Albania
 Llogara National Park

References 

Mountain ranges of Albania
Albanian Ionian Sea Coast
Karaburun-Sazan Marine Park
Llogara National Park
Geography of ancient Epirus